SS City of Leeds was a British North Sea passenger and cargo steamship that was built in Yorkshire in 1903 and scrapped in Northumberland 1937. In the First World War the Imperial German Navy captured her and used her as a depot ship.

Building
In 1903 Earle's Shipbuilding and Engineering of Hull, Yorkshire built a pair of ferries for the Great Central Railway. The Lady Mayoress of Leeds launched City of Leeds on 8 June 1903. City of Leeds sister ship  was launched on 23 July.

She was registered at Grimsby. Her UK official number was 113248 and her code letters were VDWQ.

Career
City of Leeds and City of Bradford ran scheduled services between Grimsby and Hamburg.

When the First World War began at the end of July 1914, City of Leeds was caught unawares, arrived in Hamburg as scheduled and was captured as a prize. Her captain and crew were interned, and the German navy had her converted into a mine depot ship.

After the Armistice of 11 November 1918 her crew was repatriated and City of Leeds was returned to Grimsby.

In the same year the Great Central became part of the new London and North Eastern Railway (LNER), and City of Leeds became part of its fleet.

By 1930 City of Leeds was equipped for wireless telegraphy and her navigation equipment included submarine signalling. In 1934 the call sign MFTZ superseded her code letters. From 1935 Associated Humber Lines managed her.

In 1937 the LNER sold City of Leeds for scrap. On 30 April she arrived at Blyth, Northumberland to be broken up by Hughes, Blockow & Co.

References

Bibliography

1903 ships
Maritime incidents in 1914
Passenger ships of the United Kingdom
Ships of Associated Humber Lines
Ships of the Great Central Railway
Ships built in Kingston upon Hull
Ships of the London and North Eastern Railway
Steamships of Germany
Steamships of the United Kingdom
World War I auxiliary ships of Germany